Maurice Garrel (24 February 1923 – 4 June 2011) was a French film actor.

Garrel was born in Saint-Servais, Isère.  He appeared in over a hundred films and was nominated twice for a César Award for best supporting actor: in 1991 for La Discrète and in 2005 for Kings and Queen.

Garrel was the father of producer Thierry Garrel and director Philippe Garrel, and the grandfather of actor Louis Garrel and actress Esther Garrel.

Garrel died in Paris, aged 88.

Selected filmography

 The Gorillas (1964)
 To Commit a Murder (1967) 
 The Young Wolves (1968)
 The Inheritor (1973)
 Liberté, la nuit (1984)
 A Heart in Winter (1992)
 Wild Innocence (2001)
 His Brother (2003)
 Regular Lovers (2005)
 A Burning Hot Summer (2011)

References

External links
 
 Maurice Garrel

1923 births
2011 deaths
People from Saint-Gervais, Isère
French male film actors
French male television actors
French male stage actors